Hamilton Hill may refer to:
Hamilton Hill, Western Australia, a suburb of the city of Perth, Australia
Hamilton Hill, Schenectady, New York, a neighborhood in the city of Schenectady, New York 
Hamilton Hill (singer) (1871–1910), Australian baritone singer
Hamilton Hill (comics), the fictional mayor of Gotham City in the DC Comics continuity

See also
Hamilton Hills, neighborhood of Baltimore, Maryland